Charlie Herekotukutuku (birth unknown), also known by the nickname of "H", is a New Zealand rugby league footballerwho currently plays for the Balmain Ryde Eastwood Tigers in the New South Wales Cup and the Mount Pritchard Mounties in the Bundaberg Red Cup. He was a New Zealand Māori international.

Herekotukutuku has previously played for the Canterbury Bulls, Western Suburbs, North Sydney Bears, Newtown Jets and was affiliated with the South Sydney Rabbitohs. He was selected in the NSW Residents representative team in 2008.

References

Balmain Ryde-Eastwood Tigers players
Canterbury rugby league team players
Living people
Mount Pritchard Mounties players
New Zealand Māori rugby league players
New Zealand Māori rugby league team players
New Zealand rugby league players
Newtown Jets NSW Cup players
North Sydney Bears NSW Cup players
Northern Bulldogs players
Place of birth missing (living people)
Rugby league five-eighths
Rugby league fullbacks
Rugby league halfbacks
Rugby league hookers
Year of birth missing (living people)